"The World Is Mine" is a song by French DJ David Guetta, featuring vocals from singer JD Davis. The track was released as the third single from Guetta's second studio album, Guetta Blaster on 22 November 2004. Three years later, in 2007, the track was released as a single in the United States as the follow-up to "Love Don't Let Me Go (Walking Away)", along with the Guetta Blaster album. The background samples Someone Somewhere In Summertime by Simple Minds in 1982. Thanks in part to support from Dance radio outlets like BPM, "The World is Mine" would end up giving Guetta his first number-one single on the Billboard Hot Dance Airplay chart in June 2007. The track was also the first single and only single from Guetta Blaster to be released in the United Kingdom.

Music Video
The video features a Guetta with a woman as a stripper in three different styles; a hospital with him as a panda and her as a nurse, a high school with him as a student and her as a teacher, and in an office with him as a businessman and her as a businesswoman. The woman does a strip performance for each, after which he is seen at a strip club dancing with several women, including the three main ones, who seductively dance around him.

Track listing

Charts

Weekly charts

Year-end charts

Notes

2004 singles
2007 singles
David Guetta songs
Songs written by David Guetta
2004 songs
Perfecto Records singles
Songs written by Joachim Garraud
Song recordings produced by David Guetta
Music videos directed by Stuart Gosling